Martina Šestáková (née Darmovzalová) (born 12 October 1978 in Valtice) is a Czech triple jumper. She set a personal best jump of 14.18 metres at a national athletics meet in Kladno. She is also a seven-time national triple jump champion (2002–2008), and a member of TJ Lokomotiva Břeclav, under her personal coach Michal Pogány.

Šestáková represented the Czech Republic at the 2008 Summer Olympics in Beijing, where she competed for the women's triple jump. Unfortunately, she did not receive her best mark in the qualifying rounds, after failing to jump at a specific distance in three successive attempts.

References

External links

Profile – Czech Athletic Federation 
NBC 2008 Olympics profile

Czech female triple jumpers
Living people
Olympic athletes of the Czech Republic
Athletes (track and field) at the 2008 Summer Olympics
People from Valtice
1978 births
Sportspeople from the South Moravian Region